Haiti competed at the 2019 Pan American Games in Lima, Peru from July 26 to August 11, 2019. Haiti is one of only 17 countries to have participated in all editions of the Pan American Games.

In July 2019, the Haitian team of eight athletes (four per gender) competing in six sports was officially named. This was later reduced to seven when rower Gabrielle Amato withdrew after sustaining an injury.

During the opening ceremony of the games, taekwondo athlete Aniya Louissaint carried the flag of the country as part of the parade of nations.

Competitors
The following is the list of number of competitors (per gender) participating at the games per sport/discipline.

Athletics (track and field)

Haiti qualified three athletes (two men and one woman).

Key
Note–Ranks given for track events are for the entire round
Q = Qualified for the next round

Track events

Field event
Men

Judo

Haiti qualified one male judoka.

Men

Swimming

Haiti received two universality spots in swimming to enter one man and one woman.

Taekwondo

Haiti received one wildcard in the women's +67 kg event.

Kyorugi
Women

Non-competing sports

Rowing

Haiti received a reallocated quota in the women's single sculls event. Gabrielle Amato had to later withdraw after sustaining a back injury before the games.

See also
Haiti at the 2020 Summer Olympics

References

Nations at the 2019 Pan American Games
2019
2019 in Haitian sport